Rosemarie Gillespie (4 February 1941 – 21 June 2010), also known as Waratah Rose, was an Australian lawyer, human rights activist, author and film producer. She was active in human rights causes in Australia, the USA, Melanesia, the Pacific Islands and the Middle East for more than forty years.

Education
Gillespie was born on 4 February 1941, in Melbourne, to parents of European descent. She was "not content with the restrictions imposed by the socially accepted roles for women", and campaigned as a teenager for equal access to science equipment at Melbourne Girls' Grammar School.
She enrolled in and earned degrees at University of Melbourne, University of Chicago, Monash University, and Australian National University.

Human rights
Gillespie first began campaigning for human rights causes in opposition to the White Australia policy. The policy, which ceased in 1975, restricted immigration to Australia to Europeans and other white immigrant groups and excluded Caucasians or Indo-Europeans from anywhere east of the Mediterranean apart from Turks after World War II, despite the massacre of the entire population of Smyrna and burning the city to the ground 9 September 1922, because they were ethnically Greek and Armenian.

Much of her efforts focused on human rights in Melanesia. Gillespie was briefly held as a political prisoner during the 1987 Fijian military coups d'état. 

A founder of the Bougainville Freedom Movement, Gillespie campaigned against a naval blockade of the island of Bougainville by the government of Papua New Guinea during the Civil War in the 1990s. She wrote in her website, "A cry for help from behind a military blockade, as children were dying because of a lack of medicines that could save their lives, prompted me to brave the dangers and bring relief to the besieged island." She influenced the position of the Australian government.

A critic of U.S. foreign policy, Gillespie travelled to Iraq as a human shield during the 2003 invasion of Iraq. She created two short documentary films about the war in Iraq:  Witness to Invasion and Against Humanity. She was highly critical of capitalism, calling it "institutionalised violence".

Writing
Two of Gillespie's books, Ecocide: Industrial Chemical Contamination and the Corporate Profit Imperative – The Case of Bougainville (1999) and Running with Rebels: Behind the lies in Bougainville's hidden war (2009) focused on her experiences in Bougainville.
Invasion of Iraq: An Eyewitness Account (2004) focused on her experience in Iraq.

Rosemarie Gillespie died at her daughter's home in Melbourne on 21 June 2010, at the age of 69.  She was survived by her two daughters, three grandchildren, one sister and a brother.

References

1941 births
2010 deaths
20th-century Australian lawyers
Australian human rights activists
Women human rights activists
Writers from Victoria (Australia)
Australian film producers
Activists from Melbourne
Australian anti–Iraq War activists
Autonomous Region of Bougainville
Australian women lawyers